Whiskeytown Falls is a three-tiered waterfall with a total elevation of , located in northern California's Whiskeytown National Recreation Area. Despite its size, it was largely unknown until 2005, having been improperly mapped decades before.

References

External links
James K. Carr Trail (Whiskeytown Falls)
More photos of the falls, taken August 2005

Landforms of Shasta County, California
Waterfalls of California